2017 in professional wrestling describes the year's events in the world of professional wrestling.

List of notable promotions 
These promotions held notable shows in 2017.

Calendar of notable shows

January

February

March

April

May

June

July

August

September

October

November

December

Notable events
September 1 – CyberAgent purchased DDT Pro-Wrestling, which also included Ganbare☆Pro-Wrestling and Tokyo Joshi Pro Wrestling, with CyberAgent becoming their parent company.
December 7 – Alexa Bliss vs. Sasha Banks during a WWE Live tour is the first women's match contested in the Middle East, and specifically, Abu Dhabi, United Arab Emirates

Tournaments and accomplishments

Lucha Libre AAA Worldwide (AAA)

All Japan Pro-Wrestling (AJPW)

Consejo Mundial de Lucha Libre (CMLL)

New Japan Pro-Wrestling (NJPW)

Pro Wrestling Noah

Ring of Honor

TNA/Impact/GFW

WWE

Title changes

AAA

TNA/Impact/GFW

NJPW

ROH

The Crash Lucha Libre

WWE
 – Raw
 – SmackDown
 – NXT

Raw and SmackDown
Raw and SmackDown each had a world championship, a secondary championship, a women's championship, and a male tag team championship. Raw also had a championship for their cruiserweight wrestlers.

NXT

Awards and honors

Pro Wrestling Illustrated

Wrestling Observer Newsletter

Wrestling Observer Newsletter Hall of Fame

Wrestling Observer Newsletter awards

WWE

WWE Hall of Fame

NXT Year-End Awards

The award winners were announced on NXT TakeOver: Philadelphia on January 27, 2018.

Debuts 

 January 15 – Miyuki Takase
 January 17 – Yuya Aoki
 March 4 – Satsuki Totoro
 March 5 – Hikari Shimizu
 March 26 – Kakeru Sekiguchi
 April 9 – Hanan
 April 15 
 Grayson Waller
 Leo Isaka
 April 16 – Itsuki Aoki
 May 4 – Koju Takeda
 June 11
 Hina
 Rina
 Ibuki Hoshi
 June 18 – Thekla
 June 25 – Miku Aono
 July 14 – Yukio Naya
 August 20 – Yuki Iino
 August 26 – Yuki Kamifuku
 September 16 – Rising Hayato
 September 29 – Leyla Hirsch
 October 13 – Towa Iwasaki
 October 15 – Ayame Sasamura
 October 19 – Rick Boogs
 October 29 – Giulia
 October 31 – Yuna Mizumori
 December 24 – Himeka Arita

Retirements 

 Kyoko Kimura (July 20, 2003 – January 22, 2017)
 Rosa Mendes (November 2006 – February 13, 2017)
 Kellie Skater (2007 – February 25, 2017) 
 Barry Darsow (1983-2001, 2007-2017) 
 Sachie Abe (May 2, 1996 – April 2, 2017)
 Ricardo Rodriguez (August 11, 2006 – May 5, 2017)
 Shelly Martinez (December 2000 – May 17, 2017)
 Tyson Kidd (July 23, 1995 – June 29, 2017)
 Velvet Sky (2003 – July 6, 2017) (return in ROH in 2019)
 Bob Armstrong (1960 – July 13, 2017) (returned for a match in 2019)
 Mark Henry (September 20, 1996 – August 2, 2017)
 Eva Marie (July 1, 2013 – August 4, 2017) (return in WWE in 2021)
 Sid Eudy (1987 – August 5, 2017)
 Bill Eadie (December 15, 1972-August 12, 2017) 
 Big Van Vader (1985-August 26, 2017) 
 Danny Havoc (July 30, 2005-September 9, 2017) (returned to wrestling in 2019 until his death in 2020) 
 Terry Funk (1965-September 23, 2017) 
 Atsushi Onita (April 14, 1974 – October 31, 2017)
 Manami Toyota (August 5, 1987 – November 3, 2017)
 Candice Michelle (November 15, 2004 – December 2, 2017) (full retirement, through full inactive since 2009)
 Dai Suzuki (November 28, 2014 – December 13, 2017)
 Great Kabuki (October 31, 1964 – December 22, 2017)

Deaths 

 January 9 – Timothy Well, 55
 January 15 – Jimmy Snuka, 73
 January 25 – Jun Izumida, 51
 February 2 – Tom Drake, 86
 February 10 – Bob Sweetan, 76
 February 11 – Chavo Guerrero Sr., 68
 February 16 – George Steele, 79
 February 17 – Nicole Bass, 52
 February 18 – Ivan Koloff, 74
 February 21 – Bruiser Bedlam, 53
 March 7 – Ron Bass, 68
 March 13 – Dennis Stamp, 70
 April 8 
 Joaquín Roldán, 63
 Fishman, 66
 April 10 – Larry Sharpe, 65
 April 17 – Rosey, 47
 April 20- Katsuji Ueda, 71
 April 28 – Brazo de Oro, 57
 May 7 – Gran Apache, 58
 May 16 – Doug Somers, 65
 June 8 - Ron Starr, 66 
 June 17 – Buddy Wayne, 50 
 June 23 – Mr. Pogo, 66
 July 2 – Smith Hart, 68
 July 3 – Joe Robinson, 90
 July 6 – Diane Von Hoffman, 55
 July 11 – Buddy Wolfe, 76
 August 16 - Don Nakaya Nielsen , 58
 September 14 – Otto Wanz, 74
 September 17 
 Bobby "The Brain" Heenan, 72
 Rey Celestial, 22
 October 3 – Lance Russell, 91
 October 15 – Burrhead Jones, 80
 October 20 – Stan Kowalski, 91
 November 8:
Eddy Steinblock, 61
Tugboat Taylor, 71
 December 9 – Tom Zenk, 59

See also 
List of GFW events and specials
List of MLW events
List of NJPW pay-per-view events
List of Impact Wrestling pay-per-view events
List of ROH pay-per-view events
List of WWE Network events
List of WWE pay-per-view events

References 

 
professional wrestling